Richard Katz may refer to:

 Richard Katz (writer) (1888–1968), German journalist, travel writer, and essayist
 Richard Katz (politician), politician in the California State Assembly
 Richard H. Katz (born 1942), American bridge player
 Dick Katz (Richard Aaron Katz), American jazz pianist, arranger and record producer